The Paths of the Perambulator (1985) is a fantasy novel by American writer Alan Dean Foster. The book follows the continuing adventures of Jonathan Thomas Meriweather who is transported from our world into a land of talking animals and magic. It is the fifth book in the Spellsinger series.

Plot introduction
The strange world Jon-Tom has found himself trapped in takes a turn for the decidedly weird as Foster’s fantasy series take a page from Kafka's The Metamorphosis when the Spellsinger wakes up one morning as a giant crab. The cause, as determined by the turtle wizard Clothahump, is a trapped perambulator: an inter-dimensional creature that wanders through different universes leaving behind random changes to the fabric of the world. Jon-Tom and his friends attempt to free the perambulator before it wreaks permanent havoc on their world.

External links

Alan Dean Foster homepage

1985 American novels
American fantasy novels
Novels by Alan Dean Foster
Spellsinger series